The Humen Pearl River Bridge is a bridge over the Humen, Pearl River in Guangdong Province, southern China. It consists of two main spans — a suspension bridge section and a segmental concrete section. It connects the Nansha District of Guangzhou to Humen Town of Dongguan. Completed in 1997, the suspension bridge has a main span of 888 meters, and the segmental concrete section's main span of 237 meters is among the longest such spans in the world. It forms part of the G9411 Dongguan–Foshan Expressway. A newer bridge known as Nansha Bridge, built to reduce the traffic problems on the Humen Bridge, opened to traffic in April 2019.

Features
The bridge is divided into five sections: the east approach, the suspension bridge section, the middle approach, the segmental concrete section, and the west approach. Hurricanes are common occurrences, so the design wind speed at the bridge deck level was established at 61 m/s.

Incidents
On May 5, 2020, the bridge was caught on camera violently shaking up and down. At 15:32 local time, the bridge was shut down by traffic police for safety reasons. According to Chinese state-run media, engineers inspected the main structure of the bridge, and it was found to be intact. Experts told Chinese media that the shaking was normal, and would not affect the safety of driving if the shaking was contained to a tolerable range. At 16:30 on May 7, the navigable waters of the bridge resumed navigation. On May 10, the bridge passed the structural safety assessment. On May 15, the bridge resumed traffic, but buses with more than 40 seats and trucks were prohibited from passing.

Gallery

See also
 List of longest suspension bridge spans
 List of largest bridges in China

References

External links

 
 Another photo of the bridge

Bridges in Guangzhou
Bridges over the Pearl River (China)
Suspension bridges in China
Bridges completed in 1997
Buildings and structures in Dongguan
Pearl River Delta